George Hollis (1869 – after 1897) was an English professional footballer who played as a goalkeeper.

Born in Kenilworth, Warwickshire, Hollis deputised as Small Heath's goalkeeper for England international Chris Charsley, an amateur whose career in the Birmingham City Police entailed his frequent absence from footballing duties. He made 49 appearances in all senior competitions, including 17 in Small Heath's last season in the Football Alliance and 31 in their first two seasons in the Football League. In 1894, Hollis's amateur status was reinstated and he joined Bournbrook F.C., retiring from the game in 1897.

Honours
with Small Heath
 Football League Second Division winners: 1892–93
 Football League Second Division runners-up: 1893–94

References

1869 births
Year of death missing
People from Kenilworth
English footballers
Association football goalkeepers
Birmingham City F.C. players
English Football League players
Date of birth missing
Place of death missing
Football Alliance players